This is a list of animation distribution companies.

Active
 Bandai Visual
 Cake Entertainment
 Cartoon Network Productions
 Classic Media
 Crunchyroll
 Funimation Entertainment
 GKIDS
 Harmony Gold USA
 HIT Entertainment
 Nest Family Entertainment
 Nihon Ad Systems
 PorchLight Entertainment
 Scholastic Entertainment
 Section23 Films
 Taffy Entertainment
 Viz Media
 Warner Bros. Family Entertainment
 World Events Productions

Defunct
 4Kids Entertainment
 Entertainment Rights
 Family Home Entertainment
 RKO Pictures
 Saban Entertainment
 ZIV International
 Mattel

See also
 List of animation studios

References

Animation distribution companies
Animation distribution